Miguel Alfonso Herrero Javaloyas (born 29 July 1988), commonly known as Míchel , is a Spanish professional footballer who plays mainly as an attacking midfielder for Hércules CF.

He achieved La Liga totals of over 172 games for Valencia, Deportivo, Levante, Getafe and Valladolid.

Club career

Valencia
Born in Burjassot, Valencian Community, Míchel finished his football grooming at local Burjassot CF and started playing as a senior with Valencia CF's reserves. After a string of midfield injuries to the main squad (Rubén Baraja, Edu and Manuel Fernandes) he was called up by coach Unai Emery, making his La Liga debut against FC Barcelona, playing 20 minutes in a 4–0 away loss on 6 December 2008; previous to that, he had already appeared in a Copa del Rey game against Club Portugalete, where he also scored.

Míchel's first start occurred on 3 March 2009 in the 2–1 loss at CD Numancia, as he began to be regularly summoned to the league's squad of 18 each week. He was delighted with his first year at Valencia, never having imagined he would be playing for the club's first team after being not much earlier in the Tercera División.

Loans and Levante
In early June 2010, deemed surplus to requirements by coach Emery – for instance, in the 2009–10 campaign he only collected 28 minutes in the league, all as a late substitute – Míchel was loaned for one season to Deportivo de La Coruña. He spent most of the campaign injured, and the Galicians were also relegated after 20 straight years in the top flight.

At Hércules CF, where he spent the 2011–12 season, Míchel scored a career-best 13 goals, also being a key player as the team nearly returned to the top tier. The club attempted to acquire the player permanently, but were eventually denied.

Míchel rescinded his contract with Valencia in June 2012, and signed a three-year deal with neighbouring Levante UD shortly after. He scored eight goals in 51 official games in his only season, including two in 11 in that campaign's UEFA Europa League.

Return to Valencia
On 10 May 2013, Míchel agreed on a return to former club Valencia, penning a three-year link after his €420,000 buyout clause was paid. He made his debut in his second spell on 17 August, playing the full 90 minutes in a 1–0 home win against Málaga CF.

Míchel was loaned to Getafe CF of the same league in late July 2014, for two years.

Guangzhou R&F
On 18 December 2014, Míchel was sold to Guangzhou R&F F.C. in the Chinese Super League. He made his debut for his new team on 10 February of the following year, appearing in the second preliminary round of the AFC Champions League against Warriors FC.

Míchel returned to Spain on loan in January 2016, to Real Oviedo of the Segunda División.

Valladolid
In August 2016, Míchel negotiated an end to his contract in China and signed a three-year deal with Real Valladolid. Having consolidated their place in the top division, he extended by a further year at its conclusion.

Míchel's link with was automatically renewed due to an appearances clause in the summer of 2020, amidst interest from Göztepe S.K. of Turkey. However he stayed put, and became the new captain in October after Javi Moyano left.

Míchel left the Estadio José Zorrilla on 30 June 2021, as his contract expired.

Tenerife
On 18 July 2021, free agent Míchel joined second-division CD Tenerife on a two-year deal. On 23 August 2022, he terminated his contract.

Personal life
In 2019, Míchel married BeIN Sports reporter Celia Sanchís.

Career statistics

Club

References

External links

CiberChe stats and bio 

1988 births
Living people
Sportspeople from the Province of Valencia
People from Burjassot
Spanish footballers
Footballers from the Valencian Community
Association football midfielders
La Liga players
Segunda División players
Segunda División B players
Tercera División players
Segunda Federación players
Valencia CF Mestalla footballers
Valencia CF players
Deportivo de La Coruña players
Hércules CF players
Levante UD footballers
Getafe CF footballers
Real Oviedo players
Real Valladolid players
CD Tenerife players
Chinese Super League players
Guangzhou City F.C. players
Spain under-21 international footballers
Spanish expatriate footballers
Expatriate footballers in China
Spanish expatriate sportspeople in China